Petropavlovka is a rural locality (a selo) in Mikhaylovsky Selsoviet of Mikhaylovsky District, Amur Oblast, Russia. The population was 218 as of 2018. There are 6 streets.

Geography 
Petropavlovka is located on the left bank of the Zavitaya River, 55 km northeast of Poyarkovo (the district's administrative centre) by road. Arsentyevka is the nearest rural locality.

References 

Rural localities in Mikhaylovsky District, Amur Oblast